{{DISPLAYTITLE:C6H10O2}}
The molecular formula C6H10O2 may refer to:

 Allyl glycidyl ether
 Caprolactone
 Ethyl methacrylate
 Hexane-2,5-dione
 (2R)-2-Methylpent-4-enoic acid

Molecular formulas